This list shows women who have been elected as Members of the House of Commons of the United Kingdom, European Union and other British devolved assemblies.

List of female members of the House of Commons of the United Kingdom

List of female members of the House of Lords of the United Kingdom

See also 

 Timeline of female MPs in the House of Commons
 All-women shortlists
 Election results of women in United Kingdom general elections (1918–1945)
 Parliament (Qualification of Women) Act 1918
 Records of members of parliament of the United Kingdom § Women
 Women in the House of Commons of the United Kingdom
 Widow's succession

Notes

References 

 
Female